Elisabeth (Elise) Zénaide Arnberg (11 November 1826 – 6 September 1891), was a Swedish miniaturist and photographer. She is foremost known for her portrait miniatures on ivory, but was also active as a photographer. She worked in water colors, gouache and Crayon. She frequently exhibited in Stockholm and her work is represented at the Nationalmuseum.

She was the daughter of the metalartist Eric Talén and Henrietta Engelbrecht and married the photographer Thure Arnberg (d. 1866) in 1859. She was a student of August Malmström and Anders Lundquist. Elise Arnberg lived in Falun during her marriage, but otherwise spent her life in Stockholm.

References 
 Svenskt konstnärslexikon del I, Allhems Förlag, Malmö Libris 8390296

Further reading

External links 

 

1826 births
1891 deaths
19th-century Swedish painters
19th-century Swedish photographers
Swedish women painters
Swedish painters
Swedish women photographers
Swedish photographers
19th-century women photographers